The Armed Forces (Flexible Working) Act 2018 (c. 2) is an Act of Parliament, introduced by Earl Howe on behalf of the Government, relating to British Army which gives powers to the Defence Council of the United Kingdom to make regulations about geographically restricted service for regulars and the maximum number of occasions a 'regular' can be required to serve without such a geographic restriction.

Provisions 
Flexible Service allows regular members of the armed forces to seek part-time work, reducing work routines by 20% or 40% equating to one or two days in a five-day working week and restricted separation from home base for no more than 35 days a year at the discretion of the Defence Council. Requests for flexible service are not guaranteed acceptance.

References 

United Kingdom Acts of Parliament 2018
2018 in British law
British Armed Forces